The Soccer War is a book by Ryszard Kapuściński, the Polish press correspondent in Africa and Latin America in the 1960s. The eponymous Soccer War erupts between the Central American Republics of Honduras and El Salvador, partially as a result of a football match between teams of the two countries. The deeper reasons for the conflict were political.

The book features a collection of stories from the life of the reporter and journalist as he travels into countries such as Congo, Kenya and Nigeria, then undergoing severe conflict.

Critical reception
Hartford Courant reporter Dylan Foley called it "a masterpiece of war journalism."

Filming rights to the book have been purchased by Philippe Falardeau.

References

1992 non-fiction books
Association football books